Whalley is a civil parish in Ribble Valley, Lancashire, England.  It contains 29 listed buildings that are recorded in the National Heritage List for England.  Of these, three are listed at Grade I, the highest of the three grades, one is at Grade II*, the middle grade, and the others are at Grade II, the lowest grade.  The parish contains the small town of Whalley and surrounding countryside.  The town has a long history and this is reflected in the oldest listed buildings, the parish church and the abbey.  Most of the other listed buildings consist of houses and shops in the town.  In addition there are two public houses, a sundial in the churchyard, a former school, a former corn mill, a war memorial and, outside the town, farmhouses and farm buildings, and a railway viaduct.

Key

Buildings

References

Citations

Sources

Lists of listed buildings in Lancashire
Buildings and structures in Ribble Valley